Dimitrovski is a Macedonian and Bulgarian surname that literally means "son of Dmitri", famous people with the surname include:

Dragan Dimitrovski (born 1977), Macedonian footballer (striker)
Vladimir Dimitrovski (born 1988), Macedonian footballer (left back)

See also
Dimitrov (surname)

Surnames
Macedonian-language surnames